Alan McManus (born 21 January 1971) is a Scottish retired professional snooker player and current commentator who works for Eurosport. A mainstay of the world's top sixteen during the 1990s and 2000s, he has won two ranking events, the 1994 Dubai Classic and the 1996 Thailand Open, and competed in the World Championship semi-finals in 1992, 1993 and 2016. He also won the 1994 Masters, ending Stephen Hendry's five-year, 23-match unbeaten streak at the tournament with a 9–8 victory in the final. McManus announced his retirement on 9 April 2021 after losing 6–3 to Bai Langning in the second qualifying round of the 2021 World Snooker Championship.

Career

Top 16 career and Masters winner
McManus has long been considered a consistently good player, having a record of fourteen consecutive seasons in the Top 16, but never managed to achieve the success of his contemporaries Stephen Hendry, Ken Doherty, Ronnie O'Sullivan, John Higgins and Mark Williams. He was ranked in the Top 16 from 1990 to 2006, dropping out after an unsuccessful 2005/2006 season. His highest ranking was sixth (in 1993/94 and 1996/97). McManus has reached twenty-one professional semi-finals, but won only four events. He has reached the semi-finals of the World Championship three times, but has never appeared in a final. Until 2005, he had gone eleven years without reaching the quarter-finals of the tournament, despite consistent achievements in other events.

McManus's resilience in snooker matchplay is shown by the fact that the first whitewash of his professional career came in his 0–5 defeat by Peter Ebdon at the 1998 Grand Prix, his 312th match as a professional player.

At the 1994 Masters, McManus defeated Nigel Bond by 5–2 in the first round, Ken Doherty 5–1 in the quarter-finals, and then Neal Foulds 6–4 in the semi-final to set up his first triple crown tournament final against defending champion and fellow Scot Stephen Hendry. In what became the highlight of his career, he claimed the Masters title at Wembley defeating Stephen Hendry 9–8 in the final and thus ending Hendry's unbeaten run in the tournament, which dated back to 1989. He would also win the tournaments' highest break prize, £10,000 for a 132 total clearance in the sixth frame of his first-round match against Nigel Bond.

His last major final was at the 2002 LG Cup at the Preston Guild Hall where he lost 5–9 to fellow-countryman Chris Small. A series of poor results in the 2005/2006 season saw him drop out of the top 16 for the first time since 1991. He reached the semi-finals of the 2006 Snooker Grand Prix, losing to Neil Robertson.

Dropping out of the top 16
He lost a World Championship qualifier 9–10 to journeyman Joe Delaney in 2007. This loss began an extremely quiet six-to-seven-year period for McManus, who then failed to qualify for any UK or World Championships between 2007 and 2013, and also struggled to qualify for the other ranking events (during the period between the 2006 Grand Prix and the 2013 Welsh Open, he failed to qualify for the main stages of 42 ranking events). This loss of form saw him quickly drop out of the top 16, then out of the top 32. His poor form reached a trough in the 2009/2010 season, where he failed to qualify for any of the main stages of the tournaments he took part in.

McManus was unable to qualify for any of the major venues during the 2011–12 season and he finished it ranked as number 52 in the world.

Resurgence

He made a good start to the 2012–13 season, beating Tony Drago and Robert Milkins to qualify for the final stages of the Australian Goldfields Open in Bendigo; there he beat local wildcard James Mifsud 5–0, before exiting the tournament by the same scoreline against Ding Junhui. At the 2013 Welsh Open, McManus reached his first quarter-final since the 2006 Grand Prix, with a 4–2 win over the number 16 seed Barry Hawkins, followed by a dramatic comeback to beat Joe Perry 4–3, after having trailed 0–3. He was beaten in the quarter-final 3–5 by compatriot Stephen Maguire. The following tournament, the Haikou World Open, saw McManus win three matches in qualifying to reach the latter stages of the tournament; he then beat local wildcard Lin Shuai 5–3, before facing compatriot John Higgins. McManus put in a good performance; he ultimately lost 3–5, but picked up valuable ranking points in the process.

He made a good start to the Players Tour Championship, reaching the quarter-finals of the first event, losing to Andrew Higginson by 4 frames to 3. He carried this good form to the PTC event 2, once again reaching the quarter-finals before losing 1–4 to eventual runner-up Stephen Maguire. However, McManus only managed four last-32 results from the rest of the events. This led to him being ranked 31st in the Order of Merit, just missing out on the top 28 players that qualified for the finals. At the 2013 World Snooker Championship McManus, in qualifying, beat one of India's rising stars Aditya Mehta 10–9, in an epic encounter that lasted just over 9 hours. He then defeated 1995 World finalist Nigel Bond 10–8 in the penultimate qualifying round. In the final qualifying round he led Tom Ford 5–4 after the first session; he then reeled off five of the next six frames to book his place at the Crucible Theatre for the first time since 2006. In the first round he lost to Ding Junhui 5–10, winning £12,000.

2013/2014 season

At the start of the 2013–14 season McManus was ranked 49th in the World Rankings. At the 2013 Wuxi Classic qualifiers he won his match against Darryl Hill 5–3 to qualify for the last 64 of the event held in Wuxi. At the venue he defeated Ken Doherty 5–3 before losing to Dave Gilbert 2–5. At the first Asian Tour event, he bested players such as Michael White before beating local favorite Ding Junhui 4–2 in the last 16. He then defeated Yu Delu 4–1 in the quarter-finals, reaching his first semi-final in nine years. In the semi-final he lost to eventual winner Joe Perry 2–4, despite having been 2–1 up.

McManus qualified for the inaugural Indian Open, beating amateur Sydney Wilson 4–1 in qualifying. He was then beaten 1–4 in the last 64 by Zhang Anda. McManus followed up this result by qualifying for the International Championship in beating Darren Cook 6–0. He then defeated local wildcard Zhou Yuelong 6–5, coming back from 2–4 down. In the last 64 he produced the shock of the tournament by beating defending champion Judd Trump 6–5, having been 3–4 down. However he was defeated 4–6 by Ryan Day in the following round. At the 2013 UK Championship, McManus defeated Joel Walker 6–5, winning the match on a respotted black, before losing to Michael Holt 4–6 in the last 64. McManus reached the last 16 of the German Masters, defeating Jak Jones 5–1 in qualifying. At the Tempodrom he defeated Peter Ebdon and Jack Lisowski, both by 5–2 scorelines, before being himself beaten 2–5 by Michael Holt.

McManus continued his good form into the final European Tour event of the season, where he reached the last 16 by defeating players such as Neil Robertson and Graeme Dott before losing to Fergal O'Brien. Despite also reaching the last 16 of the final Asian Tour Event of the season, McManus narrowly missed out on qualification for the Players Championship Grand Final by one place. He lost to Mark King in the second round of the Welsh Open and failed to qualify for the China Open, but was to finish the season strongly. He reached the quarter-final of the World Open, losing to Mark Selby.

The 2014 World Snooker Championship, saw McManus beat John Higgins 10–7 in the first round and then defeat Ken Doherty 13–8, to set up another quarter-final with Mark Selby. McManus performed well early on, but Selby ran away with the match in the second session to leave the Scot trailing 4–12. McManus was able to claw back the first frame of the final session but Selby won the next frame to clinch the match 13–5.

2014/2015 season

McManus continued his good form into the 2014–15 season by reaching the last 16 of the first ranking event of the season, the 2014 Wuxi Classic, where he was beaten 2–5 by Barry Hawkins. He then reached the last 16 of the Australian Goldfields Open, before losing 3–5 to Judd Trump. McManus reached the quarter-finals of the Shanghai Masters by beating Jamie Jones to qualify, before defeating Ronnie O'Sullivan 5–3 and Stephen Maguire 5–1 but then lost to the eventual winner of the tournament Stuart Bingham 1–5. McManus was able to keep up his 100% record in qualifying matches for the season by comfortably defeating Michael Georgiou to qualify for the International Championship, but was edged out by Anthony McGill in the last 64 of the tournament.

McManus would lose in the first round of the UK Championship to Joel Walker. He won his first qualifier for the 2015 German Masters against Zak Surety but was then defeated in the final qualifying round by Matthew Selt. McManus had a good run in the Welsh Open, reaching the last 16 before losing to Maguire. He performed well in the season's European Tour Events, finishing 18th on the Order of Merit. He played in four of the six events, reaching one quarter-final with a further three last 16 appearances. This gave him entry into the Grand Final where he was defeated 1–4 by Bingham in the first round. McManus won all three of his World Championship qualifying matches, defeating Michael Wasley, Andrew Pagett and Mitchell Mann to reach the main draw at the Crucible. However, an inconsistent performance against Ali Carter saw McManus bow out 5–10 in the first round.

2015/2016 season
McManus started strongly in the 2015–16 season, reaching the quarter-finals of the first event, the Riga Open, with wins over Stephen Maguire, Judd Trump and others before losing to the eventual champion Barry Hawkins 2–4. As McManus did not enter the Australian Goldfields Open, his first ranking event of the season came at the Shanghai Masters. He defeated Rory McLeod 5–4 to qualify for the tournament, and then defeated wildcard Yao Pengcheng 5–2, before losing 1–5 to Ding Junhui.

After an early exit in the Paul Hunter Classic, McManus reached the quarter-finals of the Ruhr Open, losing 3–4 to Tian Pengfei. It was during his first-round match in this tournament that he and his opponent Barry Pinches broke the record for the longest official frame of snooker. The frame lasted for 100 minutes and 24 seconds, with Pinches eventually winning the frame, although McManus would go on to win the match. The record stood until April 2017.

McManus qualified for the 2016 World Championship with comfortable victories over Michael Wasley, David Morris and Jimmy Robertson. In the first round at the Crucible he defeated his fellow-countryman Stephen Maguire 10–7, before overcoming Ali Carter 13–11 in round two. His quarter-final saw him come from 9–11 down against John Higgins to take the final four frames and win 13–11, setting up his first semi-final appearance at the World Championship since 1993. In that semi-final he lost to Ding Junhui 11–17. His end-of-season ranking of 20 was the highest he had been in a decade.

2016/2017 season
In the 2016–17 season the furthest McManus could progress in an event was at the World Open, where he beat Jamie Cope and Liang Wenbo, but he was thrashed 0–5 by Thepchaiya Un-Nooh. He would also reach the third round in the 2016 Paul Hunter Classic, defeating Andy Hicks and Christopher Keogan, both 4–1, before coming up short against Tom Ford.

2017/2018 season
McManus started the 2017–18 season at number 32 in the world rankings; and would reach the third round of both the 2017 China Championship and 2017 Paul Hunter Classic. He would also reach the second round of the 2017 UK Championship with a 6–3 win over Robin Hull; before losing a final frame decider to Jimmy Robertson 5–6.

Performance and rankings timeline

Career finals

Ranking finals: 8 (2 titles)

Minor-ranking finals: 1

Non-ranking finals: 11 (3 titles)

Team finals 3 (2 titles)

Amateur finals: 2 (1 title)

References

External links

Alan McManus at worldsnooker.com

Scottish snooker players
Masters (snooker) champions
1971 births
Living people
Sportspeople from Glasgow
People educated at Holy Cross High School, Hamilton
Snooker writers and broadcasters